Calling Paul Temple is a 1948 British crime film directed by Maclean Rogers and starring John Bentley, Dinah Sheridan and Margaretta Scott. It was the second in a series of four Paul Temple films distributed by Butcher's Film Service. The first was Send for Paul Temple (1946), with Anthony Hulme as Paul Temple. John Bentley then took over the role in Calling Paul Temple, continuing for two further films: Paul Temple's Triumph (1950) and Paul Temple Returns (1952). It was produced by Ernest G. Roy at the Nettlefold Film Studios in Walton On Thames.

Plot
A woman is found dead on a train, and the name "Rex" has been written on the pull-down blind. It is the third in a mysterious string of "Rex" murders, all carried out on trains. And soon there's a fourth murder. All the victims are discovered to have been the wealthy patients of a doctor who specialises in nervous disorders. The detective novelist Paul Temple and his wife Steve are called in to help Scotland Yard's Sir Graham Forbes solve the case before the serial killer strikes again. While at a nightclub, they receive a message from singer Norma Rice concerning the murders. But before Sir Graham has the chance to speak to her she dies, falling down the stairs in the middle of her second number, What's Cooking in Cabaret?. The suspects include the Egyptian therapist Dr Kohima, his mysterious secretary Mrs Trevelyan, and a salesman, Hugh Pryse of the Quick Boil Kettle Company (in the next carriage when one of the murders takes place).

Production
Calling Paul Temple was based on the Francis Durbridge radio serial Send for Paul Temple Again, broadcast in September 1945. Writing credits for the film are Francis Durbridge, A.R. Rawlinson & Kathleen Butler. Steve Race (with Sid Colin) wrote the two songs performed by Celia Lipton, and appeared himself as the bandleader in the nightclub section. The footage includes evocative shots of gothic Canterbury in the 1940s.

Cast

References

External links

1948 films
British crime films
1948 crime films
1940s serial killer films
Films directed by Maclean Rogers
Films set in Kent
Films shot in Kent
British black-and-white films
Films based on radio series
Films produced by Ernest G. Roy
1940s English-language films
1940s British films